The Freak (Eddie March) is a fictional character associated with Iron Man appearing in American comic books published by Marvel Comics. He was introduced as a boxer who looked up to Tony Stark, and called himself "Iron Man" in the ring.

Publication history
Eddie March is the second Marvel Comics character to use the Freak name. Like the first, Happy Hogan, Eddie March was another friend of Tony Stark. He wore Iron Man's armor in Invincible Iron Man #21 (Jan 1970), in a fight against the Crimson Dynamo. He was the first African-American to wear Iron Man's armor.

Eddie March first appears as the Freak in Iron Man #67 (April 1974), by Mike Friedrich and George Tuska.

Fictional character biography
While wearing the Iron Man armor, Eddie March is badly injured in a fight with Thor. Stark decides to use the Enervator on Eddie in a desperate attempt to save him. Though Stark takes precautions to prevent the device from transforming Eddie into a monstrous creature, Eddie nonetheless becomes a second version of the Freak. Stark, as Iron Man, tries to subdue him while simultaneously protecting him from the police. He is able to knock out the Freak with a few nerve punches. Once unconscious, the Freak reverts to human form and Thor's alter ego, Dr. Donald Blake, is able to operate on March to save his life.

Eddie has not transformed into the Freak again since this incident.

References

External links

Characters created by David Anthony Kraft
Comics characters introduced in 1970
Spider-Man characters